Kyle Stanley Hunter is an American art director and comic book artist.  His art direction credits include Polyhedron, Dragon, and Dungeon magazines, as well as Star Wars Gamer and Undefeated.  Kyle is also noted for his prematurely canceled science fiction comic book Swerve, numerous illustrations in Dungeon and Dragon magazines, and a two-page Dungeons and Dragons-based comic in Polyhedron and later Dungeon called Downer (which was collected into two comic book volumes in 2007 and is being sold via Paizo Publishing).

Hunter is also an infrequent poster on the Paizo messageboards.

Hunter shares a blog site with former Dungeon Magazine editor and Living Greyhawk Gazetteer co-author Erik Mona, as well as Mutants & Masterminds art director Sean Glenn.

External links 
http://www.paizo.com

American art directors
American comics artists
American illustrators
Fantasy artists
Living people
1970 births